Magdalena  is a town and municipality in the state of Jalisco in central-western Mexico. Magdalena lies 78 kilometers northwest of Guadalajara. The municipality covers an area of 445.36 km². It borders the state of Nayarit to the west, and the town of Tequila to the east. As of 2005, the municipality had a total population of 18,924.

Geography 
The town is situated on rather high 1350 meters above sea level. It borders mountains to the north and somehow smaller hills to the south.

In the west, there is a big water reservoir called the Laguna de Magdalena, which features many different birds.

Gems
Magdalena is famous for fire opals; the whole region accommodates hundreds of mines where Obsidian, Fire opals, and other rocks are produced. In the town, there are several stores selling stones.

References

External links
Chess Club Magdalena Jalisco
Xochiltepec-Monte cubiero de flores - (Xochiltepec - The old name of Magdalena Jalisco)

Municipalities of Jalisco